Colin Forde (born 16 September 1949) is a Barbadian former cyclist. He competed in the individual road race and the individual pursuit events at the 1968 Summer Olympics.

References

External links
 

1949 births
Living people
Barbadian male cyclists
Olympic cyclists of Barbados
Cyclists at the 1968 Summer Olympics
Commonwealth Games competitors for Barbados
Cyclists at the 1970 British Commonwealth Games